The Mihran Mesrobian House is a historic building located in Chevy Chase, Montgomery County, Maryland, United States. The house was designed by well-regarded Washington, D.C.-area architect Mihran Mesrobian. It is the only residence that he designed for himself and his wife, Zabelle. Mesrobian was better known for his Beaux-Arts designs in the 1920s and Art Deco designs in the 1930s. He chose the Art Moderne style for his house, which was completed in 1941. It stands out among the more traditional revival styles in the neighborhood. Earlier designs for the house show "a much more radical, modernistic design," but he made concessions to the "Chevy Chase Land Company's more conservative design covenants." The two-story frame and brick veneer structure has a full basement. It features asymmetrical massing, whitewashed brick that resembles concrete, glass block panels, a sun porch on the second floor, and a low hip roof. The cinderblock and brick perimeter wall with classical cast-stone decorative elements and the gate were also designed by Mesrobian and completed in 1945.

Mesrobian lived in the house until his death in 1975. It was listed on the National Register of Historic Places in 2017.

References

External links

Armenian-American history
Houses completed in 1941
Streamline Moderne architecture in Maryland
Houses in Montgomery County, Maryland
National Register of Historic Places in Montgomery County, Maryland
Houses on the National Register of Historic Places in Maryland
Chevy Chase (town), Maryland